Karma Killer may refer to:

"Karma Killer", a 1998 song by Robbie Williams from I've Been Expecting You
"Karma Killer", a 2001 song by Cyclefly with Chester Bennington from Crave
Karma Killer, a 2008 album by Negative